Franco Tognini (26 October 1907 – 27 April 1980) was an Italian gymnast who won a gold medal at the 1932 Summer Olympics. After two participations at the Summer Olympics (1932 and 1936), he was the coach of the Italy national team at the 1948 Summer Olympics.

References

External links
 
  Gymnast profile at the Ginnasticapavese.it

1907 births
1980 deaths
Italian male artistic gymnasts
Gymnasts at the 1932 Summer Olympics
Gymnasts at the 1936 Summer Olympics
Olympic gymnasts of Italy
Olympic gold medalists for Italy
Olympic medalists in gymnastics
Medalists at the 1932 Summer Olympics